Mary Vaughan Jones (28 May 1918–April/May/June 1983) was a celebrated Welsh children's author and schoolteacher.

She was born at 'Firs Cottage', Maenan near Llanrwst in 1918, and died in the Rhuddlan area, Clwyd in 1983.

Jones authored approximately 20 books, contributing regularly to children's literature in Wales, and the magazines of the Urdd.

Many of her books have been re-published by Gymdeithas Lyfrau Ceredigion. Many new books are based on her characters, for example: Sali Mali a'r Ceffyl Gwyllt, Dylan Williams, 2006. Various children's television programmes and merchandise connected to her characters have also been produced by S4C. The original illustrations in her books were the work of Rowena Wyn Jones and later, Jac Jones.

During her career as a teacher she worked at:
 Ysgol Gynradd Cwm Penanner (1940–1943)
 Ysgol Lluest Aberystwyth (1943–1949)
 Ysgol Baratoad Aber-mad (1949–1953)
 Ysgol Gymraeg Aberystwyth (1953–1958)
 Lecturer at Bangor Normal College (1958–1972)

An award was established to commemorate her literary contribution.

Bibliography 
 Cyfres Darllen Stori: 1. Sali Mali (First published 1969)
 Cyfres Darllen Stori: 2. Y Pry Bach Tew (First published 1969)
 Cyfres Darllen Stori: 3. Annwyd y Pry Bach Tew (First published 1972)
 Cyfres Darllen Stori: 4. Jaci Soch (First published 1969)
 Cyfres Darllen Stori: 5: Tomos Caradog 1969
 Cyfres Darllen Stori: 7. Pastai Tomos Caradog (First published April 1997)
 Cyfres Darllen Stori: 8. Morgan a Magi Ann (First published 1975, then again in 2002)
 Cyfres Darllen Stori: 9. Siencyn (First published 1975)
 Cyfres Darllen Stori: Bobi Jo (First published 1976)
 Llyfrau Dau Dau: Rhigymau Jac y Jwc
 Llyfrau Dau Dau: Llyfr Bach Jac y Jwc
 Llyfrau Dau Dau: Llyfr Mawr Jac y Jwc
 Llyfrau Dau Dau: Llyfr Bach Nicw Nacw
 Llyfrau Dau Dau: Llyfr Mawr Nicw Nacw
 Llyfrau Dau Dau: Llyfr Bach Dwmplen Malwoden
 Llyfrau Dau Dau: Llyfr Mawr Dwmplen Malwoden
 Llyfrau Dau Dau: Llyfr Bach Guto
 Llyfrau Dau Dau: Llyfr Mawr Guto
 Llyfrau Dau Dau: Llyfr Mawr Culhwch
 Llyfrau Dau Dau: Storïau Llafar 1
 Llyfrau Dau Dau: Canllaw Athrawon
 Cynllun y Porth: Ni ein Hunain - Y Goeden
 Y Dynion Bach Od
 Ben y Garddwr a Storïau Eraill (Tir na n-Og Award winner 1989)
 Sami Seimon a Storïau Eraill
 Begw'r Iâr yn Mynd am Dro  (First published 1980)

References

1918 births
1983 deaths
20th-century Welsh educators
20th-century women educators
20th-century Welsh writers
20th-century Welsh women writers
People from Conwy County Borough
Welsh children's writers
British women children's writers
Llanddoged and Maenan